Kovil Sanna Puram  is a village in the Thiruvidaimarudur taluk of Thanjavur district, Tamil Nadu, in India.

Villages in Thanjavur district